Holsteinborg (Fort Holstein) may refer to:

 Holsteinborg Castle in eastern Denmark
 Holsteinborg (surname), a Danish noble family
 Holstein-Holsteinborg (surname), a Danish noble family
 Sisimiut, Greenland, formerly known as Holsteinsborg or Holsteinborg